Kim Han-bin (born October 22, 1996), better known by his stage name, B.I, is a rapper, singer-songwriter, record producer, executive producer, and dancer under 131. 

B.I was the leader of the K-pop group iKon, and was credited with the production and songwriting for all the releases under the group. For his work on Return, B.I won Songwriter of the Year at the 10th Melon Music awards, becoming the youngest awardee at the age of 22 and also the only male idol to receive the award.

On January 22, 2019, B.I became a full member of the Korea Music Copyright Association (KOMCA). As of February 2023, the KOMCA has 93 songs registered under his name. All song credits are adapted from the KOMCA's database, unless otherwise noted.

Additionally, B.I holds songwriting credits for several other artists, including current and former artists under YG Entertainment such as Epik High, Winner, Blackpink, Psy, Seungri, Lee Hi and Eun Ji-won.

Solo works

iKon albums/singles

Other artists

Other works

Notes

References

B.I, List of songs written by